Canarium divergens is a tree in the family Burseraceae. The specific epithet  is from the Latin meaning "diverging", referring to the branching of the inflorescences.

Description
The scaly bark is grey-white.

Distribution and habitat
Canarium divergens is endemic to Borneo. Its habitat is mixed dipterocarp forests from sea-level to  altitude.

References

divergens
Endemic flora of Borneo
Trees of Borneo
Plants described in 1883
Flora of the Borneo lowland rain forests